The UCLA Herb Alpert School of Music, located on the campus of the University of California, Los Angeles, is “the first school of music to be established in the University of California system.” Established in 2007 under the purview of the UCLA School of Arts and Architecture and the UCLA Division of Humanities, the UC Board of Regents formally voted in January 2016 to establish the school.[1] Supported in part by a $30 million endowment from the Herb Alpert Foundation.[1]

Opera singer and Professor of Voice, Eileen L. Strempel  was appointed as the school's inaugural dean, effective July 8, 2019. The school is subdivided into the Department of Ethnomusicology, the Department of Music, and the Department of Musicology, and also home to an interdepartmental program in Global Jazz Studies and a minor in Music Industry.

History 
With the creation in 1919 of an art gallery and music department, the UCLA leadership committed to offer the study of the arts in a liberal arts research university context. The College of Applied Arts was established in 1939 with the inclusion of an art department. In 1960, the college was renamed the College of Fine Arts, which carried departments of art, dance, music, and theater arts.

In 1988, several big changes occurred in departments throughout the school: Ethnomusicology and Musicology separated from Music, while Design and Art History separated from Art. Art History and Musicology entered the umbrella of the Humanities division of the college while Design and Ethnomusicology remained in Fine Arts.

Then in 1991, the College of Fine Arts was disestablished, giving rise to two separate schools: the School of the Arts and the School of Theater, Film and Television. With the conjoining of architecture to the School of Fine Arts in UCLA's Professional School Restructuring Initiative in 1994, the school was then renamed the School of the Arts and Architecture.

In 2014, a proposal was made for the creation of a School of Music for the college. The new school, called the Herb Alpert School of Music, created in 2016, would join the trio of “independent but complementary arts-centered” schools: the current School of Theater, Film, Television, a redefined School of the Arts and Architecture, and the new School of Music.

In 2020, UCLA announced the Herb Alpert School of Music would establish the Lowell Milken Center for Music of American Jewish Experience to support the research, scholarship and performance of American Jewish music.

The name Herb Alpert School of Music was approved by the Board of Regents after the acceptance of a donation of $30 million from the Herb Alpert Foundation in 2007.

Facilities 
The entire school is housed in either the Schoenberg Music Building, established in 1955 and 1965, and the Evelyn and Mo Ostin Music Center, a pair of buildings completed in 2014.[5]

Schoenberg Music Building 
Named in honor of former UCLA faculty member and composer Arnold Schoenberg, this facility houses the Dean's office, administrative offices for the school's departments, most faculty offices, as well as two large theaters. Schoenberg Hall, which seats about 520, is the main auditorium of the Schoenberg building. Lani Hall  is a 133-seat house intended mainly for small performance groups and lectures, although it has been used for many other types of events.”

Aside from the performance venues, Schoenberg Hall also contains the Henry Mancini Media Lab as well as the World Music Center. The World Music Center acts as a composing studio, recording studio, and a classroom. The World Music Center includes the Ethnomusicology Archive, the World Musical Instrument Collection, and is home to publications by the Ethnomusicology department. Additionally, the building contains a keyboard lab, a computer lab, six classrooms, 46 practice rooms, an orchestra room, a band room, a choral room, the headquarters office of the Herbie Hancock Institute of Jazz Performance at UCLA as well as the Music Library.

Evelyn and Mo Ostin Music Center 

The Evelyn and Mo Ostin Music Center, completed in 2014, “includes a high-tech recording studio, spaces for rehearsal and teaching, a café and social space for students, and an Internet-based music production center.”[10] Paid for in part by a $10 million donation by Music Industry Executive and Philanthropist Morris “Mo” Ostin and his late wife, Evelyn Ostin, to his alma mater, the center was designed by LA-based architects Daly Genik Architects under the direction of principal Kevin Daly. The center was honored in 2016 at the 46th Annual Los Angeles Architectural Awards by Los Angeles Business Council.

Ensembles 
The Herb Alpert School of Music has 35 active ensembles that perform classical, contemporary, jazz, popular and world music. Under the direction of performance faculty, students also premiere new works, including those by established composers, students, faculty and alumni.

Chamber ensembles 
Chamber ensembles at UCLA include Chamber Singers, Brass Ensemble, Camarades, Early Music Ensemble, FLUX Contemporary Ensemble, Guitar Ensemble, Percussion Ensemble, and Woodwind Chamber Ensembles.

World music ensembles 
World music ensembles include the Afro-Latin Jazz Orchestra, Klezmer Music Ensemble, Mariachi de Uclatàn, Music of Bali, Music of China, Music of India, and many others.

Sister institutes

Institute of Ethnomusicology 
Founded in 1960, the Institute of Ethnomusicology was established under the supervision of Dr. Mantle Hood by UCLA Chancellor Gene D. Block. Mantle Hood brought to the program a belief that “ethnomusicology includes the musical practice, and "instrument" is interpreted in its literal meaning. Performance, under experienced leadership, is an integral part of the program at U.C.L.A.”[13] The ethnomusicology student is taught practical training in the performance of various types of non-Western music. Since its founding the institute has hosted a large number of internationally-known master musicians and instructors from different world traditions; purchased an impressive collection of world musical instruments; the collection of traditional sound recordings for what is now one of the largest sound archives in the U.S.; supported scientific work in systematic musicology, particularly the development and use of the melograph, an automatic music writer, for musical transcription; and 5) supported the research work of ethnomusicology faculty by creating a publications program for the dissemination of their work.”

Herbie Hancock Institute of Jazz Performance 

Established as a college outreach program by the Herbie Hancock Institute of Jazz in Washington D.C., the Herbie Hancock Institute of Jazz Performance at UCLA is a two-year tuition free study program.

The Institute only accepts one ensemble per class annually with students participating in many international and domestic outreach events such as the 40th anniversary of the coronation of the King of Thailand.

Notable alumni 
 Cristian Amigo – composer, guitarist, ethnomusicologist
 Brian Asawa – countertenor
 Angel Blue – soprano
 Don Davis – composer
 Akin Euba – musicologist, composer, pianist
 Martha Gonzales – ethnomusicologist, singer, artist, activist
 Ara Guzelimian – academic, scholar
 Jake Heggie – composer, pianist
 James Horner – film composer
 Randy Newman – singer-songwriter, arranger, composer, pianist
 Leonard Stein – musicologist, pianist, conductor
 Kamasi Washington – jazz saxophonist, composer
 John Williams – composer, conductor, pianist
 LaMonte Young – composer
 Shahab Paranj – composer

Notable faculty 
 Boris Allakhverdyan - clarinetist
 Justo Almario - flutist, saxophonist, bandleader
 Terence Blanchard - trumpeter, composer
 Denis Bouriakov - flutist
 Roger Bourland - composer
 Bruce Broughton - composer
 Kenny Burrell - jazz guitarist, composer
 Mark Carlson- composer
 Gloria Cheng - pianist
 Vladimir Chernov - baritone
 Richard Danielpour - composer
 Aubrey Foard - tubist
 Herbie Hancock - jazz pianist, keyboardist, bandleader, composer
 Johana Harris  - pianist
 Roy Harris - composer
 Tamir Hendelman - jazz pianist
 Billy Higgins - jazz drummer
 Henri Lazarof - composer
 Jens Lindemann - trumpeter
 David Leaf - musicologist, writer, producer, director
 Steve Loza - ethnomusicologist
 Barbara Morrison - jazz singer
 Arturo O'Farrill - jazz pianist, composer,bandleader
 David Raksin - composer 
 Paul Reale- composer
 Arnold Schoenberg - composer 
 Wayne Shorter - jazz saxophonist and composer
 Leonard Stein – musicologist, pianist, conductor
 Gerald Wilson - jazz trumpeter

References 

Herb
Music schools in California
2007 establishments in California